Iserhoff may refer to:

Iserhoff River, a tributary of Lake Waswanipi, in Eeyou Istchee Baie-James, Quebec, Canada
Iserhoff River North, a tributary of the Iserhoff River